Eilema aistleitneri is a species of arctiid moth found in Cape Verde. It is named after its discoverer, Eyjolf Aistleitner.

References

External links
 

Moths described in 2013
Moths of Cape Verde
aistleitneri